The women's competition in the super-heavyweight (– 75 kg) division was held on 25 September 2010.

Schedule

Medalists

Records

Results

New records

References
(Page 61) Start List
Results

- Women's + 75 kg, 2010 World Weightlifting Championships
2010 in women's weightlifting